Depthcharge is a single-player arcade game released in 1977 by Gremlin Industries. The game, which uses a black-and-white CRT display, presents the player with a cut-away view of a section of ocean, on the surface of which is a destroyer with submarines passing beneath it.  The player drops depth charges (up to six at a time) to destroy the submarines and moves the ship back and forth in order to avoid the submarines' mines.  Up to four submarines may be present at any given time, each of which bears a score for destroying it that increases with its depth.

Legacy

Arcade clones
 Depthbomb (ディプスボンブ) (Sega, 1978)
 Sub Hunter (サブハンター) (Taito)
 Submarine (サブマリン) (Data East)
 Deep Scan (Sega, 1979)

Home clones
 Depth Charge (Apple II, 1978)
 Depthcharge (Commodore 64, 1983)
 Sub Chase (ZX Spectrum, 1983)
 Submarine (ZX Spectrum, 1984)
 Depth Charge (ZX Spectrum, 1984)
 Sub Hunt (Commodore 64, 1984)
 Depth Charge (MS-DOS, 1984), text-based game
 Sub Attack (Commodore 64, 1985)
 Depthcharge (Amiga, 1994)

Notes

References
 

1977 video games
Arcade video games
Gremlin Industries games
Video games developed in the United States